Bernhard von Breidenbach (also Breydenbach) (ca. 1440 – 1497) was a politician in the Electorate of Mainz. He wrote a travel report, Peregrinatio in terram sanctam (1486), from his travels to the Holy Land.

In Jerusalem he met Felix Fabri.

References

Bibliography 
Davies, Hugh Wm., 1911, Bernhard von Breydenbach and his journey to the Holy Land 1483-4 : a bibliography

Works by Breydenbach
 Peregrinatio in terram sanctam, Mainz 1486
 Andreas Klußmann (Hrsg.): Bernhard von Breydenbach: Peregrinatio in terram sanctam. Erste deutsche Ausgabe von Peter Schöffer, Mainz 1486. Faksimile, 159 Blätter, zahlreiche Illustrationen und Faltpanoramen, Saarbrücken 2008, .
 Isolde Mozer (Hrsg.): Bernhard von Breydenbach: Peregrinatio in terram sanctam. Eine Pilgerreise ins Heilige Land. Frühneuhochdeutscher Text und Übersetzung. de Gruyter, Berlin 2010, . (Rezension.)
 Bewehrtes Reisebuch deß heiligen Lands, oder, Eine gründliche Beschreibung aller Meer- und Bilgerfahrten zum heiligen Lande, so von vielen hohen, auch andern Stands Personen, zu Wasser und Land vorgenommen... Da auch weiters Die eigentliche Beschreibung deß gantzen heiligen Lands Palaestinae, sampt desselben Landschaften Digitalisat.

1440 births
1497 deaths
Medieval Knights of the Holy Sepulchre
Mainz